Sills Cummis & Gross P.C. (formerly Sills, Beck, Cummis, Radin, Tischman & Zuckerman) is a full-service corporate law firm with offices in New Jersey and New York.

History
The firm was founded by former New Jersey Attorney General Arthur J. Sills.

Notable alumni
Shalom D. Stone, nominee to the United States Court of Appeals for the Third Circuit
Steven M. Goldman, New Jersey Commissioner of Banking and Insurance

External links
Official Firm Website
Sills Cummis & Gross Redevelopment Blog
See this firm's profile and run a side-by-side comparison with other firms on Martindale.com
Organizational Profile as listed at the National Law Review
Law Firm Snapshot on Martindale.com

References

Law firms established in 1971
Law firms based in Newark, New Jersey
American companies established in 1971
1971 establishments in New Jersey